Hexachaeta is a genus of tephritid  or fruit flies in the family Tephritidae.

Species in Hexachaeta include:

Hexachaeta aex Walker, 1849
Hexachaeta abscura
Hexachaeta amabilis
Hexachaeta bifurcata
Hexachaeta bondari
Hexachaeta colombiana
Hexachaeta cronia
Hexachaeta dinia
Hexachaeta ecuatoriana
Hexachaeta enderleini
Hexachaeta eximia
Hexachaeta fallax
Hexachaeta guatemalensis
Hexachaeta homalura
Hexachaeta isshikii
Hexachaeta itatiaiensis
Hexachaeta leptofasciata
Hexachaeta major
Hexachaeta monoctigma
Hexachaeta monostigma
Hexachaeta nigripes
Hexachaeta nigriventris
Hexachaeta oblita
Hexachaeta obscura
Hexachaeta parva
Hexachaeta pulchella
Hexachaeta rupta
Hexachaeta seabrai
Hexachaeta shannoni
Hexachaeta spitzi
Hexachaeta valida
Hexachaeta venezuelana
Hexachaeta zeteki

References

 
Trypetinae
Tephritidae genera